Robert Henry Rice (17 Sep 1903 – 20 May 1994), was an American submarine commander during World War II who was awarded the Navy Cross twice. He reached the rank of Vice Admiral in the United States Navy.

References

1903 births
1994 deaths
United States Navy personnel of World War II
Recipients of the Navy Cross (United States)
United States Naval Academy alumni
United States Navy vice admirals